Ngawang Lobsang Thupten Gyatso Jigdral Chokley Namgyal, abbreviated to Thubten Gyatso (12 February 1876 – 17 December 1933) was the 13th Dalai Lama of Tibet, enthroned during a turbulent era and the collapse of the Qing Empire. Referred to as "the Great Thirteenth", he is also known for redeclaring Tibet's national independence, and for his reform and modernization initiatives.

In 1878, he was recognized as the reincarnation of the Dalai Lama. He was escorted to Lhasa and given his pre-novice vows by the Panchen Lama, Tenpai Wangchuk, and named "Ngawang Lobsang Thupten Gyatso Jigdral Chokley Namgyal". In 1879, he was enthroned at the Potala Palace, but did not assume political power until 1895, after he had reached his maturity.

Thubten Gyatso was an intellectual reformer and skillful politician. He was responsible for countering the British expedition to Tibet, restoring discipline in monastic life, and increasing the number of lay officials to avoid excessive power being placed in the hands of the monks.

Early life
The 13th Dalai Lama was born in the village of Thakpo Langdun, one day by car, south-east from Lhasa, and near Sam-ye Monastery, Tak-po province, in June 1876 to parents Kunga Rinchen and Lobsang Dolma, a peasant couple. Laird gives his birthdate as 27 May 1876, and Mullin gives it as dawn on the 5th month of the Fire Mouse Year (1876).

Contact with Agvan Dorzhiev

Agvan Dorzhiev (1854–1938), a Khori-Buryat Mongol, and a Russian subject, was born in the village of Khara-Shibir, not far from Ulan Ude, to the east of Lake Baikal. He left home in 1873 at age 19 to study at the Gelugpa monastery, Drepung, near Lhasa, the largest monastery in Tibet. Having successfully completed the traditional course of religious studies, he began the academic Buddhist degree of Geshey Lharampa (the highest level of 'Doctorate of Buddhist Philosophy'). He continued his studies to become Tsanid-Hambo, or "Master of Buddhist Philosophy". He became a tutor and "debating partner" of the teenage Dalai Lama, who became very friendly with him and later used him as an envoy to Russia and other countries.

Military expeditions in Tibet

After the British expedition to Tibet by Sir Francis Younghusband in early 1904, Dorzhiev convinced the Dalai Lama to flee to Urga in Mongolia, almost  to the northeast of Lhasa, a journey which took four months. The Dalai Lama spent over a year in Urga and the Wang Khuree Monastery (to the west from the capital) giving teachings to the Mongolians. In Urga he met the 8th Bogd Gegeen Jebtsundamba Khutuktu several times (the spiritual leader of Outer Mongolia). The content of these meetings is unknown. According to report from A.D. Khitrovo, the Russian Border Commissioner in Kyakhta, the Dalai Lama and the influential Mongol Khutuktus, high lamas and princes "irrevocably decided to secede from China as an independent federal state, carrying out this operation under the patronage and support from Russia, taking care to avoid the bloodshed". The Dalai Lama insisted that if Russia would not help, he would even ask Britain, his former foe, for assistance.

After the Dalai Lama fled, the Qing dynasty immediately proclaimed him deposed and again asserted sovereignty over Tibet, making claims over Nepal and Bhutan as well. The Treaty of Lhasa was signed at the Potala between Great Britain and Tibet in the presence of the Amban and Nepalese and Bhutanese representatives on 7 September 1904. The provisions of the 1904 treaty were confirmed in a 1906 treaty signed between Great Britain and China. The British, for a fee from the Qing court, also agreed not to annex Tibetan territory or to interfere in the administration of Tibet, while China agreed not to permit any other foreign state to interfere with the territory or internal administration of Tibet.

The Dalai Lama is thought to have been involved with the anti-foreign 1905 Tibetan Rebellion. The British invasion of Lhasa in 1904 had repercussions in the Tibetan Buddhist world, causing extreme anti-western and anti-Christian sentiment among Tibetan Buddhists. The British invasion also triggered intense and sudden Qing intervention in Tibetan areas, to develop, assimilate, and bring the regions under strong Qing central control. The Tibetan Lamas in Batang proceeded to revolt in 1905, massacring Chinese officials, French missionaries, and Christian Catholic converts. The Tibetan monks opposed the Catholics, razing the Catholic mission's Church, and slaughtering all Catholic missionaries and Qing officials. The Manchu Qing official Fengquan was assassinated by the Tibetan Batang Lamas, along with other Manchu and Han Chinese Qing officials and the French Catholic priests, who were all massacred when the rebellion started in March 1905. Tibetan Gelugpa monks in Nyarong, Chamdo, and Litang also revolted and attacked missions and churches and slaughtered westerners. The British invasion of Lhasa, the missionaries, and the Qing were linked in the eyes of the Tibetans, as hostile foreigners to be attacked. Zhongtian (Chungtien) was the location of Batang monastery. The Tibetans slaughtered the converts, torched the building of the missionaries in Batang due to their xenophobia. Sir Francis Edward Younghusband wrote that At the same time, on the opposite side of Tibet they were still more actively aggressive, expelling the Roman Catholic missionaries from their long-established homes at Batang, massacring many of their converts, and burning the mission-house. There was anti-Christian sentiment and xenophobia running rampant in Tibet.

In October 1906, John Weston Brooke was the first Englishman to gain an audience with the Dalai Lama, and subsequently he was granted permission to lead two expeditions into Tibet. Also in 1906, Sir Charles Alfred Bell, was invited to visit Thubten Chökyi Nyima, the 9th Panchen Lama at Tashilhunpo, where they had friendly discussions on the political situation.

The Dalai Lama later stayed at the great Kumbum Monastery near Xining and then travelled east to the most sacred of four Buddhist mountain in China, Wutai Shan located 300 km from Beijing. From here, the Dalai Lama received a parade of envoys: William Woodville Rockhill, the American Minister in Peking; Gustaf Mannerheim, an Imperial Russian army colonel, who later became the Marshal of Finland and the 6th President of Finland; a German doctor from the Peking Legation; an English explorer named Christopher Irving; R.F. Johnson, a British diplomat from the Colonial Service; and Henri D'Ollone, the French army major and viscount. The Dalai Lama was mounting a campaign to strengthen his international ties and free his kingdom from Chinese rule.

In June 1908, C.G.E. Mannerheim met Thubten Gyatso in Wutai Shan during the course of his expedition from Turkestan to Peking. Mannerheim wrote his diary and notes in Swedish to conceal the fact that his ethnographic and scientific party was also an elaborate intelligence gathering mission for the Imperial Russian army. The 13th Dalai Lama gave a blessing of white silk for the Russian Czar. Worried about his safety, Mannerheim gave Tibet's spiritual pontiff a Browning revolver and showed him how to reload the weapon.

In September 1908, the Dalai Lama was granted an audience with the Guangxu Emperor and Empress Dowager Cixi. The emperor tried to stress Tibet's subservient role, although the Dalai Lama refused to kowtow to him. He stayed in Beijing until the end of 1908.

When he returned to Tibet in December 1908, he began reorganising the government, but the Qing sent a military expedition of its own to Tibet in 1910 and he had to flee to India.

In 1911 the Qing dynasty was overthrown in the Xinhai Revolution and by the end of 1912 the last Qing troops had been escorted out of Tibet.

Assumption of political power

In 1895, Thubten Gyatso assumed ruling power from the monasteries which had previously wielded great influence through the Regent. Due to his two periods of exile in 1904–1909, to escape the British invasion of 1904, and from 1910 to 1913 to escape a Chinese invasion, he became well aware of the complexities of international politics and was the first Dalai Lama to become aware of the importance of foreign relations. The Dalai Lama, "accompanied by six ministers and a small escort" which included his close aide, diplomat and military figure Tsarong Dzasa, fled via Jelep La to Sikkim and Darjeeling, where they stayed almost two years. During this period he was invited to Calcutta by the Viceroy, Lord Minto, which helped restore relations with the British.

Thubten Gyatso returned to Lhasa in January 1913 with Tsarong Dzasa from Darjeeling, where he had been living in exile. The new Chinese government apologised for the actions of the previous Qing dynasty and offered to restore the Dalai Lama to his former position. He replied that he was not interested in Chinese ranks and was assuming spiritual and political leadership of Tibet.

After his return from exile in India in 1913, Thubten Gyatso assumed control of foreign relations and dealt directly with the Maharaja and the British Political officer in Sikkim and the king of Nepal rather than letting the Kashag or parliament do it.

Documents from Russian Foreign Ministry archives contain detailed argumentation of the 13th Dalai Lama that Tibet was never a part of China. Thubten Gyatso declared independence from China in early 1913 (13 February), after returning from India following three years of exile. He then standardized the Tibetan flag in its present form. At the end of 1912 the first postage stamps of Tibet and the first bank notes were issued.

Thubten Gyatso built a new medical college (Mentsikang) in 1913 on the site of the post-revolutionary traditional hospital near the Jokhang.

Legislation was introduced to counter corruption among officials, a national taxation system was established and enforced, and a police force was created. The penal system was revised and made uniform throughout the country. "Capital punishment was completely abolished and corporal punishment was reduced. Living conditions in jails were also improved, and officials were designated to see that these conditions and rules were maintained."

A secular education system was introduced in addition to the religious education system. Thubten Gyatso sent four promising students to England to study, and welcomed foreigners, including Japanese, British and Americans.

As a result of his travels and contacts with foreign powers and their representatives (e.g., Pyotr Kozlov, Charles Alfred Bell and Gustaf Mannerheim), the Dalai Lama showed an interest in world affairs and introduced electricity, the telephone and the first motor cars  to Tibet. Nonetheless, at the end of his life in 1933, he saw that Tibet was about to retreat from outside influences.

In the last decade of his life, the Dalai Lama's personal attendant, Thubten Kunphela rose to power and led several important projects for the modernization in Tibet. In 1931, a new factory complex consisting of currency mints and munition factories was established in Trapchi, with its machines driven by power from the first hydroelectric plant in Tibet. A modern army regiment was created in the same year, after the conflict broke out in Eastern Tibet.

In 1930, Tibetan army invaded the Xikang and the Qinghai in the Sino-Tibetan War. In 1932, the Muslim Qinghai and Han-Chinese Sichuan armies of the National Revolutionary Army led by Chinese Muslim General Ma Bufang and Han General Liu Wenhui defeated the Tibetan army during the subsequent Qinghai–Tibet War. Ma Bufang overran the Tibetan armies and recaptured several counties in Xikang province. Shiqu, Dengke, and other counties were seized from the Tibetans. The Tibetans were pushed back to the other side of the Jinsha river. Ma and Liu warned Tibetan officials not to dare cross the Jinsha river again. Ma Bufang defeated the Tibetans at Dan Chokorgon. Several Tibetan generals surrendered, and were demoted by the Dalai Lama. By August, the Tibetans lost so much land to Liu Wenhui and Ma Bufang's forces that the Dalai Lama telegraphed the British government of India for assistance. British political pressure led to Nanjing declaring a ceasefire. Separate truces were signed by Ma and Liu with the Tibetans in 1933, ending the fighting.

Prophecies and death
The 13th Dalai Lama predicted before dying:

Approximately 6,000 monasteries were destroyed during the Cultural Revolution, destroying the vast majority of historic Tibetan architecture.

References

Further reading

 Bell, Charles (1946) Portrait of a Dalai Lama: the Life and Times of the Great Thirteenth by Charles Alfred Bell, Sir Charles Bell, Publisher: Wisdom Publications (MA), January 1987,  (first published as Portrait of the Dalai Lama: London: Collins, 1946).
 Bell, Charles (1924) Tibet: Past and Present. Oxford: Clarendon Press
 Bell, Charles (1931) The Religion of Tibet. Oxford: Clarendon Press
 Gelek, Surkhang Wangchen. 1982. "Tibet: The Critical Years (Part 1) The Thirteenth Dalai Lama". The Tibet Journal. Vol. VII, No. 4. Winter 1982, pp. 11–19.
 Goldstein, Melvyn C. A History of Modern Tibet, 1913–1951: the demise of the Lamaist state (Berkeley: University of California Press, 1989) 
 
 
 Mullin, Glenn H. (2001). The Fourteen Dalai Lamas: A Sacred Legacy of Reincarnation, pp. 376–451. Clear Light Publishers. Santa Fe, New Mexico. .
 Richardson, Hugh E.(1984): Tibet & its History. Boulder and London: Shambala. .
 Samten, Jampa. (2010). "Notes on the Thirteenth Dalai Lama's Confidential Letter to the Tsar of Russia." In: The Tibet Journal, Special issue. Autumn 2009 vol XXXIV n. 3-Summer 2010 vol XXXV n. 2. "The Earth Ox Papers", edited by Roberto Vitali, pp. 357–370.
 Smith, Warren (1997):Tibetan Nation. New Delhi: HarperCollins. 
 Tamm, Eric Enno. "The Horse That Leaps Through Clouds: A Tale of Espionage, the Silk Road and the Rise of Modern China." Vancouver: Douglas & McIntyre, 2010, Chapter 17 & 18. . See http://horsethatleaps.com
 Tsering Shakya (1999): The Dragon in the Land of Snows. A History of Modern Tibet since 1947. London:Pimlico. 
 The Wonderful Rosary of Jewels. An official biography compiled for the Tibetan Government, completed in February 1940

External links

 The Thirteenth Dalai Lama, Tubten Gyatso by Tsering Shakya

1876 births
1933 deaths
A3
Place of birth missing
19th-century Tibetan people
20th-century Tibetan people